Baumgartner (also Baumgärtner, Baumgardner, Bumgardner, Bumgartner or Bumgarner) is a surname of German origin, literally meaning "Tree Gardener". It may refer to:

Baumgartner surname
 Ann Baumgartner (1918–2008), first American female jet pilot
 Beate Baumgartner (born 1983), Austrian-Namibian singer
 Brian Baumgartner (born 1972), American actor
 Bruce Baumgartner (born 1960), American wrestler
 Christoph Baumgartner (born 1999), Austrian footballer
 Felix Baumgartner (born 1969), Austrian skydiver and base jumper
 Karl Baumgartner (1949–2014), German film producer
 Harold Baumgartner (1883–1938), South African cricketer
 James Earl Baumgartner (1943–2011), American mathematician
 Jason Baumgartner, American engineer
 Johann Wolfgang Baumgartner (1702–1761), German painter
 Joseph Baumgartner, Bavarian politician
 Julian Baumgartner, American art conservator
 Ken Baumgartner (born 1966), Canadian ice hockey player
 Michael Baumgartner (born 1975), American politician
 Nolan Baumgartner (born 1976), Canadian hockey player
 Paul Baumgartner (1903–1976), Swiss pianist
 Peter Baumgartner (businessman), Swiss businessman
 Rudolf Baumgartner (1917–2002), Swiss conductor and violinist
 Stan Baumgartner (1894–1955), American baseball player
 Steve Baumgartner (born 1951), American football player
 Tanja Ariane Baumgartner (born 19??), German mezzo-soprano
 Thomas Baumgartner (born c. 1945), American economist 
 Zsolt Baumgartner (born 1981), Hungarian race driver

Baumgardner surname

 Alycia Baumgardner, American boxer

 Jennifer Baumgardner (born 1970), American feminist and author
 John Baumgardner, American intelligent design proponent
 Randy Baumgardner (born 1956), American politician

Bumgardner surname
 Max Bumgardner (1923–2005), American football player
 Rex Bumgardner (1923–1998), American football player
 Heidi Gardner, American actress, comedian, and writer, Saturday Night Live

Bumgarner surname
 A. L. Bumgarner, NASCAR cup series owner from the 1950s
 Constance Bumgarner Gee, American scholar, memoirist, and advocate of the medical use of cannabis
 James Garner (1928-2014; born James Scott Bumgarner), American actor, producer, and voice artist
 Madison Bumgarner (born 1989), American baseball player
 Michael Bumgarner (born 1959), United States Army military police officer
 Michele Bumgarner (born 1989), Filipina racing driver
 Samantha Bumgarner (1878–1960), country and folk music performer

See also 

 Baumgartner's axiom in mathematics
 The Baumgartner Prize of the Vienna Academy of Sciences
 James Garner (born James Bumgarner) (1928–2014), American film and TV actor
 Jack Garner (born Jack Bumgarner) (1926–2011), American film and TV actor

German-language surnames
Occupational surnames